Essex North or North Essex may refer to:

Canada 
 Essex North (electoral district), a federal electoral district in Ontario, Canada 1883–1925
 Essex North (provincial electoral district), a provincial electoral district in Ontario, Canada 1875–1999

England 

 The northern part of Essex, a county in the East of England

 North Essex (UK Parliament constituency), a constituency of the British House of Commons, 1832–1868 and 1997–2010
 Essex North and Suffolk South (European Parliament constituency)
Harwich and North Essex (UK Parliament constituency)